The Route du Rhum is a single person transatlantic race the 2002 race was the 7th edition and had seven classes with 58 boats taking part.

Results

ORMA 60 Multihulls

Multihulls

IMOCA 60

Monohulls - Class 1,2 & 3

External Links
 
 Official YouTube Channel

Reference

Route du Rhum
2002 in sailing
Route du Rhum
Single-handed sailing competitions
IMOCA 60 competitions